John Twizell Wawn (1801 – 21 September 1859) was a British Liberal and Radical politician.

Wawn was first elected Radical MP for South Shields in 1841 and held the seat until he stood down at the 1852 general election. Although he attempted to regain the seat at the 1859 general election as a Liberal, he was unsuccessful.

References

External links
 

Members of the Parliament of the United Kingdom for English constituencies
UK MPs 1841–1847
UK MPs 1847–1852
1801 births
1859 deaths